The M'Goun Conservation Area is a protected area and UNESCO Global Geopark in the Atlas Mountains of central Morocco.

Sites

The conservation area includes the following sites.
Bin el Ouidane Dam
Geopark Museum in Azilal
Imi-n-Ifri Formation
Ouzoud Falls
Zaouiat Ahansal

References

Atlas Mountains
Protected areas of Morocco